Du Jiahao (born 31 July 1955) is a Chinese politician, serving since 2016 as the Communist Party Secretary of Hunan province. He served between 2013 and 2016 as the Governor of Hunan. Before that, he served as Vice Governor of Heilongjiang province, and also held many positions in Shanghai, including party chief of the Pudong New Area.

Career
Du Jiahao was born in Shanghai, but is considered a native of his ancestral home of Yin County, Zhejiang by Chinese convention. He entered the work force in March 1973, working at the farm tool factory of Yuejin Farm in rural Shanghai.  He joined the Communist Party of China in December that year.

Du worked in the farm administration system of Shanghai for most of the next two decades.  In 1983 he enrolled at the Chinese department of East China Normal University on a part-time basis, earning a bachelor's degree in literature in 1988.

In March 1992 Du Jiahao became the Deputy Communist Party Secretary of Songjiang County (converted to an urban district in 1998) in suburban Shanghai, rising to Party Secretary the next year.  From 1995 to 1998 he studied economics at the graduate school of the Central Party School, also on a part-time basis.

From 1999 to 2003 Du was the party chief of the urban Yangpu District of Shanghai, and from 2004 to 2007 he was the party chief of the sub-provincial level Pudong New Area of eastern Shanghai.  About the same time he enrolled at the China Europe International Business School, obtaining an MBA in 2007.

In December 2007 Du was transferred out of Shanghai for the first time of his career, to Heilongjiang province in Northeastern China where he was appointed Vice Governor, and later deputy party chief in April 2011.

In March 2013 Du was transferred again, to become the deputy party chief of Hunan province in south-central China.  He was appointed Acting Governor of Hunan in April and Governor on 31 May 2013. Sometime in 2013, he was awarded a civil honour by the Austrian state of Burgenland. In August 2016, in anticipation of the 19th Party Congress, Du was elevated to the post of Communist Party Secretary of Hunan. Many observers saw this as potentially preparing him for even further elevation.

In December 2020, Du was appointed as the Deputy Chairperson of the National People's Congress Financial and Economic Affairs Committee.

Du is an alternate member of the 18th Central Committee of the Communist Party of China.

References

Living people
1955 births
Governors of Hunan
Chinese Communist Party politicians from Shanghai
People's Republic of China politicians from Shanghai
Political office-holders in Shanghai
Political office-holders in Heilongjiang
East China Normal University alumni
Delegates to the 12th National People's Congress
Alternate members of the 18th Central Committee of the Chinese Communist Party
Members of the 19th Central Committee of the Chinese Communist Party